Montefalco is a historic small hill town in Umbria, Italy, with a population of 5,581 in August 2017.  It has been settled since pre-Roman times, and retains many of its historic buildings. From 1446 to 1861 it was part of the Papal States.  Montefalco DOC is a regulated geographical area for its wine, the reds usually including the highly localized Sagrantino grape variety.  The town's museum is in a former church, which has a fresco cycle on the life of St. Francis by the Florentine artist Benozzo Gozzoli (1450–1452).

History
The town has been actively settled since the times of the Umbri. It has been under the successive domination of the Romans, Lombards, being called Coccorone in the Middle Ages. In 1249 it was sacked by Frederick II, but was soon rebuilt with the modern name. from the 13th century it had been a free comune under the domination of local nobles and merchants, but later, as with many other Umbrian locales, the comune gave way to government by a Signoria — in this case, that of the Trinci from the nearby Foligno (1383–1439). In 1446 it fell under the rule of the Papal States where it remained until the unification of Italy in 1861.

St. Clare of Montefalco, sometimes known as St. Clare of the Cross, was born in Montefalco and died there in 1308.

Monuments and sites of interest

Religious architecture or sites 
Montefalco today has several churches in Romanesque, Gothic, and Renaissance styles.
San Francesco: now the town's museum, and an important museum in Umbria.  The church is notable for its fresco cycle on the life of St. Francis, by the Florentine artist Benozzo Gozzoli (1450–1452). Other artists represented in the museum include Perugino, Francesco Melanzio, Pier Antonio Mezzastris, Antoniazzo Romano and Tiberio d'Assisi.
Sant'Agostino
Santa Chiara: sanctuary built in 1615, it rises adjacent to the Franciscan monastery linked to this local saint, and now incorporates as the Chapel of the Holy Cross, the apse of the former Chiesa di Santa Croce with 14th century frescoes on the life of Chiara of Montefalco
Santa Illuminata
San Fortunato: built in the 4th century over the tomb of Fortunatus of Spoleto and renovated in the 15th century, had frescoes by Gozzoli and Tiberio d'Assisi.

Secular architecture or sites 
The 13th century Palazzo Comunale ("Town Hall") has a mullioned window from the original edifice and a 15th-century portal. Also notable are the gates in the walls, including Porta Sant'Agostino, Porta Camiano and Porta Federico II.

Wine
The comune of Montefalco and a small area of the comune of Bevagna constitute the regulated geographical area for Montefalco wines.  Every year around Easter, the town sponsors a major festival called Settimana Enologica — or Wine Week — where visitors can enjoy the principal wines produced in the area including the comparatively simple red table wine, Montefalco Rosso, the more complex DOCG red wines Sagrantino, for which the area is famous, and the Montefalco Sagrantino secco.

References

External links

Commons: Convento di San Fortunato with frescoes by Gozzoli
Official website
Tourist Website
Montefalco Wine Consortium
Tutto Montefalco
Bill Thayer's site (including Urbini's Spello, Bevagna, Montefalco)

Hilltowns in Umbria
Wine regions of Italy
Cittaslow